(also written 2015 XX169) is an Apollo asteroid that is a temporary horseshoe companion to the Earth, the tenth known Earth horseshoe librator.

Discovery
 was discovered on 9 December 2015 by R. G. Matheny observing with the 1.5-m reflector telescope at the Mount Lemmon Survey. As of 6 December 2016, it has been observed 47 times with an observation arc of 363 days.

Orbit and orbital evolution
 is currently an Apollo asteroid (Earth-crossing but with a period greater than a year). Its semi-major axis (currently 1.00096 AU) is similar to that of Earth (1.00074 AU), but it has a relatively low eccentricity (0.18431) and moderate orbital inclination (7.640°). It alternates between being an Apollo asteroid and being an Aten asteroid, changing dynamical status approximately every 130 years. As of 9 March 2016, this object is the 15th known Earth co-orbital and the 10th known object following a horseshoe path with respect to our planet. Asteroid  follows an asymmetrical horseshoe path with respect to our planet; the value of its relative mean longitude oscillates about 180°, but enclosing 0°.

Physical properties
With an absolute magnitude of 27.4, it has a diameter in the range 9–22 meters (for an assumed albedo range of 0.20–0.04, respectively).

See also 
 54509 YORP
 
 3753 Cruithne

Notes

References

Further reading
 Understanding the Distribution of Near-Earth Asteroids Bottke, W. F., Jedicke, R., Morbidelli, A., Petit, J.-M., Gladman, B. 2000, Science, Vol. 288, Issue 5474, pp. 2190–2194.
 A Numerical Survey of Transient Co-orbitals of the Terrestrial Planets Christou, A. A. 2000, Icarus, Vol. 144, Issue 1, pp. 1–20.
 Debiased Orbital and Absolute Magnitude Distribution of the Near-Earth Objects Bottke, W. F., Morbidelli, A., Jedicke, R., Petit, J.-M., Levison, H. F., Michel, P., Metcalfe, T. S. 2002, Icarus, Vol. 156, Issue 2, pp. 399–433.
 Transient co-orbital asteroids Brasser, R., Innanen, K. A., Connors, M., Veillet, C., Wiegert, P., Mikkola, S., Chodas, P. W. 2004, Icarus, Vol. 171, Issue 1, pp. 102–109.
 A trio of horseshoes: past, present and future dynamical evolution of Earth co-orbital asteroids 2015 XX169, 2015 YA and 2015 YQ1 de la Fuente Marcos, C., de la Fuente Marcos, R. 2016, Astrophysics and Space Science, Vol. 361, Issue 4, article 121 (13 pp.)

External links 
 Discovery MPEC 
  data at MPC
 ADS MPEC record
 Sciency Thoughts blog entry
 
 
 

Minor planet object articles (unnumbered)
Earth-crossing asteroids

20151209